Anja Rücker (born 20 December 1972) is a retired German sprinter who specialized in the 400 metres.

Rücker was born in Bad Lobenstein, Bezirk Gera. At the 1996 Summer Olympics in Atlanta, she won a bronze medal in the 4 x 400 metres relay with her teammates Uta Rohländer, Linda Kisabaka and Grit Breuer. Her personal best time is 49.74 seconds, achieved at the 1999 World Championships in Seville.

Achievements

References

External links

1972 births
Living people
People from Bad Lobenstein
People from Bezirk Gera
German female sprinters
Sportspeople from Thuringia
Olympic athletes of Germany
Athletes (track and field) at the 1992 Summer Olympics
Athletes (track and field) at the 1996 Summer Olympics
World Athletics Championships athletes for Germany
Olympic bronze medalists for Germany
World Athletics Championships medalists
European Athletics Championships medalists
Olympic bronze medalists in athletics (track and field)
World Athletics Indoor Championships medalists
World Athletics Championships winners
Medalists at the 1996 Summer Olympics
20th-century German women
Olympic female sprinters